Archimede has been borne by at least two ships of the Italian Navy:

 , an  launched in 1933 and transferred to the Spanish Navy in 1937.
 , a  launched in 1939 and sunk in 1943.

Italian Navy ship names